Shah Pesar Mard (also Romanized as Shāh Pesar Mard) is a village in Poshtkuh Rural District, Bushkan District, Dashtestan County, Bushehr Province, Iran. At the 2006 census, its population was 112, in 23 families.

References 

Populated places in Dashtestan County